Children's Hour, initially The Children's Hour, was the BBC's principal recreational service for children (as distinct from "Broadcasts to Schools") which began during the period when radio was the only medium of broadcasting.

Children's Hour was broadcast from 1922 to 1964, originally from the BBC's Birmingham station 5IT, soon joined by other regional stations, then in the BBC Regional Programme, before transferring to its final home, the new BBC Home Service, at the outbreak of the second World War. Parts of the programme were also rebroadcast by the BBC World Service. For the last three years of its life (from 17 April 1961 until 27 March 1964), the title Children's Hour was no longer used, the programmes in its "time-slot" going out under the umbrella heading of For the Young.

The programme takes its name from a verse by Longfellow: "Between the dark and the daylight, When the night is beginning to lower, Comes a pause in the day's occupations, That is known as the Children's Hour."

Broadcast history

In the United Kingdom, Children's Hour was broadcast from 5 pm to 6 pm  every day of the week, with the biggest listening figures being at weekends when parents joined in too. It was the time of day during the week when children could be expected to be home from school, and was aimed at an audience aged about 5 to 15 years.  Programming was imbued with Reithian virtues, and Children's Hour was often criticised, like "Auntie" BBC itself, for paternalism and middle-class values. It was nonetheless hugely popular, and its presenters were national figures, their voices instantly recognisable.  Derek McCulloch was closely involved with the programme from 1926, and ran the department from 1933 until 1950, when he had to resign for health reasons. From 1928 to 1960, Children's Hour in Scotland was organised and presented by Kathleen Garscadden, known as Auntie Kathleen, whose popularity brought crowds to the radio station in Glasgow. Popular nature study programmes on Children's Hour were presented by George Bramwell Evens ('Romany of the BBC'), Norman Ellison ('Nomad of the BBC') and David Seth-Smith (the 'Zoo Man of the BBC') in England and Wales during the 1930s, 40s and 50s.  On Scottish Children's Hour their equivalents were Gilbert Dempster Fisher (the 'Hut Man of the BBC'), James Douglas-Home (the 'Bird Man'), and Thomas Haining Gillespie (known later as the 'Zoo Man of the Scottish BBC').

The definitive history of the programme can be found in the book BBC Children's Hour by Wallace Grevatt, edited by Trevor Hill and published by The Book Guild in 1988. With a foreword by David Davis, who became synonymous with the programme, its 21 chapters trace the chronological history and also deal with the BBC's six regions: Midland, Northern, West of England, Welsh, Scottish, and Northern Ireland.

Trevor Hill was one of the key producers on Children's Hour and was based in Manchester but later moved across to BBC Television where he introduced Children's Television Club, the original Northern-based presenters being Geoffrey Wheeler and Judith Chalmers, before it moved to London. A full account of Hill's wide-ranging career can be found in his autobiography Over the Airwaves (2005), which includes much detail about Children's Hour. He was later asked by the BBC to write and produce radio programmes in tribute to three Children's Hour regulars, Derek McCulloch (Uncle Mac), Wilfred Pickles and Violet Carson.

The programme's closure was decided in 1964 by Frank Gillard following an enormous decline in listenership—by the end of 1963, the number of listeners had fallen to 25,000. Gillard said that most of them were "middle-aged and elderly ladies who liked to be reminded of the golden days of their youth", and that young listeners had instead turned to watching television, listening to the BBC Light Programme or to pirate radio. There was considerable complaint about the closing of the service and questions were raised in Parliament.

Programmes 

Among popular series on Children's Hour were:

Said the Cat to the Dog, Music at Random, Top of the Form, and serialisations of stories by children's authors such as Malcolm Saville, Rosemary Sutcliff, Elizabeth Clark and Arthur Ransome. Well-known musicians such as Norman Fulton (1940s) and Peter Maxwell Davies (1950s) composed music for the programme. An unknown teenage Maxwell Davies sent in a composition called "Clouds" which raised a few eyebrows and was duly invited in to see whether "he's a genius or mad". The stalwarts of Nursery Sing Song, Trevor Hill and Violet Carson, decided he was the former so Hill took him under his wing from then on, setting him on his way by introducing him to conductor Charles Groves and others.

People 

Among actors and presenters who were famous for their work on Children's Hour were:

Peggy Bacon as producer and presenter ("Aunty Peggy") from 1947
Arthur Burrows ('Uncle Arthur' - also the first London wireless Uncle)
Violet Carson
David Davis
John Darren
Norman Ellison, aka Nomad the Naturalist
Rev George Bramwell Evens, aka Romany
Carleton Hobbs
Rupert Gould ('The Stargazer')
Derek McCulloch ('Uncle Mac')
Kathleen Garsgadden ('Auntie Kathleen')
Jon Pertwee
Wilfred Pickles
David Seth-Smith, aka The Zoo Man
Olive Shapley
Norman Shelley
Barrie Hesketh
Stephen King-Hall
William Glynne-Jones

L. Stanton Jefferies composed music for some early programmes.

Notes and references

BBC Home Service programmes
British children's radio programmes
1922 radio programme debuts
1964 radio programme endings
BBC World Service programmes